Fakhrabad (also Romanized as Fakhrābād) is a village in Baghestan Rural District, in the Central District of Bavanat County, Fars Province, Iran. At the 2006 census, its population was 1,074, in 288 families.

References 

Populated places in Bavanat County